SH1 or SH-1 may refer to:

 State Highway 1; see List of highways numbered 1
 SH1 (classification), a Paralympic shooting classification
 PCL-09, exported as SH1, a Chinese truck-mounted howitzer artillery system
 Silent Hill, the first video game of the Silent Hill franchise

See also
SH (disambiguation)
SHA-1, a cryptographic hash function